Aleksandr Kabakov was a Russian writer and journalist. He was born in 1943 in Novosibirsk, where his family had been evacuated during World War II. He studied mechanics and mathematics in Dnepropetrovsk, and worked in a missile factory after graduation. Eventually, he landed at the railroad industry newspaper Gudok, where he worked for more than a decade; he also worked at Moscow News and Kommersant.

He became well known during the perestroika period for his dystopian novel No Return, which was translated into multiple languages and also adapted into a film. The English translation was done by Thomas Whitney. Other noted works include The Last Hero (1995) and Nothing's Lost (2003), which won the second jury prize from the Big Book Award and the Apollon Grigoriev Prize. With Yevgeny Popov, he co-wrote a book of reminiscences about the writer Vasily Aksyonov that was shortlisted for the 2012 Big Book Award.

Kabakov expressed his admiration for writers such as Georgi Vladimov, Yuri Trifonov, Sergei Dovlatov, Asar Eppel, Valery Popov, and Ludmila Ulitskaya.

He died in Moscow in 2020.

Works
 Aksyonov (co-written with Evgeny Popov) – second jury prize, Big Book Award, 2012
 Nothing's Lost – Big Book Award finalist, 2006, won second jury prize; won Apollon Grigoriev Prize, 2004
 Moscow Tales – Big Book Award finalist, 2006; won Prose of the Year, 2005; won Ivan Bunin Prize, 2006 
 No Return (Невозвращенец) (William Morrow & Co., 1990, tr. Thomas Whitney) 
 Anthologies: “Shelter” in Read Russia! (Read Russia, 2012, tr. Daniel Jaffe) and Life Stories: Original Works by Russian Writers (Russian Life, 2009, tr. Anna Seluyanova)
 A Runaway (Беглец), 2009
 The Imposter (Самозванец), 1997

References

1943 births
2020 deaths
Writers from Novosibirsk
Russian journalists
21st-century Russian male writers